ASTEP may refer to:
 Astrobiology Science and Technology for Exploring Planets, a former NASA program focused on planetary exploration
 Antarctic Search for Transiting ExoPlanets, a European 40 cm telescope active at the Concordia Research Station